CHASOS was a satirical art activism project, launched 2011 by Andreas Heusser. It consisted in creation of the fictitious charity organization "Christian Humanitarian Asylum Self-Aid Organization Switzerland" (CHASOS) and several actions performed by its president, pastor Wilfried Stocher.

Art vs. Politics 
The project was performed 2011 in the context of the political debates on the feared "waves of refugees" to Switzerland due to the Arab Spring. Although Switzerland has a long humanitarian tradition and is still one of the richest countries in the world, many Swiss politicians and Christian church representatives were not concerned about how to help, but how to avoid the refugees. "Switzerland is bursting at all seams. We cannot accept and nanny thousands of North Africans. That would be state support for asylum abuse." (Lukas Reimann, SVP). The satirical project was aimed to question the moral status of these arguments by means of subversive affirmation and parody.

Prevention campaign for foreigners 
The project started with the publication of a propaganda video where a pastor addresses potential "waves of refugees" and tries to deter them from "rolling" into Switzerland. The video was a satire on a previous deterrence TV spot produced by the Swiss Government which was aimed at potential immigrants from Africa.

Petition for art relocation  
The pastor launched also an online petition which demanded that all funds for artists and cultural institutions should be suspended, and that their funds and spaces should be used for refugee aid. The petition triggered many outraged reactions, especially among artists.

Refugee camp hall 32 
During the Art Basel, a bleak refugee camp only equipped with the bare essentials was installed in hall Nr. 32. It was electronically secured with a high barbed wire and video monitored. Its main function was obviously not to give shelter to refugees, but to protect the Swiss population from them. According to the artist, it was the original intention to have it populated with "real" refugees during the duration of the Art Basel, but the prospect participants left before the start of the project so that the camp remained empty.

Reception 
The project was controversially discussed in the media and gave rise to the question of how far political art can or must go to gain attention.

External links 
 Website of Andreas Heusser

References 

Political art
Swiss political satire
Performance art
Contemporary works of art
Culture jamming
Culture jamming techniques
Propaganda art
Swiss art